Božalość, also transliterated as Božaloshtsh or Bozaloshtsh is a messenger of death in Wendish mythology (Wends, Lusatian Sorbs).

The name was translated in German ethnographic sources as "Gottesklage" i.e., "God's Lament").

An 1886 article Das Spreewaldhaus by W. v. Schulenburg associates it with the elder bush and describes it as a woman dressed in white with long braided hair and red eyes:
Sambucus nigra; weil einst die Božalość kam, die Gottesklage (die im Fliederstrauch sitzt), ein Weibchen, weiss gekleidet, mit langem verwilderten Haar und rothen Augen, als man H. brannte. Nach Hartknoch glaubten die Litthauer, unter Hollunderbäumen hätten Götter ihren Sitz,...

Biren Bonnerjea describes it as a little woman with long hair, who cries under the window of someone who is about to die.

A parallel creature is Bože sedleško, described as a crying child in white clothes. The name is of unclear etymology (the apparent association with the word translated as "seat" is unclear).

Etymology
While there is an agreement that 'Božalość' means "God's Lament', the opinions about the etymology differ. In some opinions it is the contraction of "Boža žaloć", i.e., "God's Pity". Another opinion is that the word "Glosc" in the meaning of "lament" can be found in manuscripts of as early as the 17th century, and the attribute 'Boža' i.e., "God's" was added in folklore later, similarly to the poetic usages "God's wind", "God's Sun", etc.

See also
 Banshee

References

Slavic legendary creatures
Female legendary creatures